The 1997 Adelaide Rams season was the Adelaide Rams' debut season as a rugby league club. They competed in the Super League's Telstra Cup and World Club Championship.

The club had appointed St. George Dragons international back rower Rod Reddy to be their inaugural coach, along with two-time NSWRL premiership-winning  Kerrod Walters from the Brisbane Broncos to be the first captain of the team. Most of the junior players were drawn from the SARL's lower grade competitions in the region.

First match
The club played its first premiership match against the North Queensland Cowboys on 1 March 1997 and, after leading 16–4 at half time, eventually lost 24–16.

This game was the first to be played of the new Super League competition.

Results
Their first home match, against the Hunter Mariners, was also the Rams' first win, and drew their record home attendance of 27,435 to the Adelaide Oval, one of only two home wins for the season. The Rams also won four away games with their first being in Round 4 against the Auckland Warriors at the Ericsson Stadium in Auckland, New Zealand, but their overall record of 6 wins, 11 losses and 1 draw placed them second last on the Super League premiership ladder, one win ahead of North Queensland.

The Rams first home game attendance of 27,435 was the 4th highest attendance of the entire 1997 season, behind only the Grand Final at the ANZ Stadium in Brisbane (58,912), the opening game of the season in Brisbane (42,361) and a Round 6 match at the Stockland Stadium in Townsville (30,122). The Rams average home attendance of 15,330 was also the 4th best in the league behind Brisbane (19,298), North Queensland (17,539) and Auckland (15,442).

Telstra Cup

World Club Championship
The Rams were placed in Australasia Pool B along with the Hunter Mariners, North Queensland Cowboys and Perth Reds and would be matched up against teams from Europe Pool B including the Leeds Rhinos, Oldham Bears and Salford City Reds. The competition would see the Rams play three games at home and three in England.

The Rams won their three home games rather easily, but only managed to win one of their games in England leaving them in third place in their pool. As only one team from Australasia Pool B would go on to the Quarter finals, this meant that the Adelaide Rams did not advance past the group stage of the tournament.

Pool B

Players

Excluding World Club Challenge matches, Goal kicking utility back Kurt Wrigley was the Rams top point scorer for the season with 81 points from 5 tries, 30 goals and 1 field goal. Wrigley and fullback Rod Maybon were the team's top try scorers with 5 each.

Under Super League's rules, players were free to choose their own numbers which they would use throughout the season rather than wearing the traditional 1 through 13.

†Full team list not available for WCC matches against Oldham on 20 June 1997 or 25 July 1997, or against Leeds on 18 July 1997 or Salford on 3 August 1997 but this player scored in one or more of these matches and so is awarded an appearance for that match.

References

Adelaide Rams
Adelaide Rams
Australian rugby league club seasons